Keskpäevane praam {English: The Midday Ferry) is a 1967 Estonian drama film directed by Kaljo Kiisk.

Awards, nominations, participations:
 1968: All-Union Film Festival, jury special diploma to the actor Uno Loit
 1968: Baltic republics, Belarus and Moldavia Film Festival (USSR), diploma and award: "Mioritsa"

Plot

Cast
Enn Kraam - Boy
Kersti Gern - Girl
Ada Lundver - Hairdresser Leili
Eino Tamberg - Lecturer Artur
Uno Loit - Veteran Müller (disabled)
Lea Unt - Tiiu
Arne Laos - Captain
Kalju Karask - Wheelman
Heino Arus - Boatswain
Robert Gutman - Ats
Rudolf Allabert - Jumbu
Kalju Komissarov - Boy in Moskvich
Mare Garsnek - Philologist Reet
Väino Aren - Fisherman

References

External links
 
 Keskpäevane praam, entry in Estonian Film Database (EFIS)

1967 films
Estonian drama films
Estonian-language films